Jakub Łukowski (born 25 May 1996) is a Polish professional footballer who plays as a winger for Korona Kielce.

Honours 
Zawisza Bydgoszcz
Winner
 Polish Cup: 2013–14
 Polish Super Cup: 2014

References

External links 
 
 

Living people
1996 births
Sportspeople from Bydgoszcz
Zawisza Bydgoszcz players
Wisła Płock players
Olimpia Grudziądz players
Miedź Legnica players
Korona Kielce players
Ekstraklasa players
I liga players
Polish footballers
Association football midfielders
Poland youth international footballers